The Faculté de médecine is one of four medical schools in the Canadian province of Quebec. The faculty is part of the Université de Sherbrooke and is located in Sherbrooke, Quebec, southeast of Montreal.

See also

Centre hospitalier universitaire de Sherbrooke

External links 
 Faculté de médecine - Université de Sherbrooke official website (in French)

Medical schools in Canada
Université de Sherbrooke